James Cobblah Dissiramah (born 13 September 1983 in Accra) is a Ghanaian football player, he currently plays for Sisaket F.C.

Career 
Dissiramah began his career with Liberty Professionals FC and was signed on 19 October 2007 from Mumbai FC, after a successful trial with Indian club On 30 September 2009 his contract with Mumbai FC was not renewed and he left India to sign for Ghanaian club Stay Cool Professionals. He played than a year with Maldives top club Club Valencia, before in January 2011 returned to Liberty Professionals FC. Dissiramah signed in Mai 2011 with Thai Premier League side Sisaket F.C. and played his debut on 14 May against Thai Port F.C.

International career 
He previously captained the Ghanaian national football team and represented his country at the African Nations Cup and Topfo Cup.

Honours
2006: Panasonic Best Player Award

References

1983 births
Living people
Footballers from Accra

Association football defenders
Ghanaian footballers
Liberty Professionals F.C. players
Mumbai FC players
Club Valencia players
James Dissiramah
Expatriate footballers in India
Expatriate footballers in the Maldives
Expatriate footballers in Thailand
Ghanaian expatriate sportspeople in India
Ghanaian expatriate sportspeople in Thailand